A gubernatorial election was held on 10 April 2011 to elect the Governor of Hokkaido Prefecture.

Candidates
Harumi Takahashi - incumbent governor of Hokkaido, age 57.
 - ex-civil servant, age 50.
 - candidate in the 2007 Hokkaido gubernatorial election, age 48
 - former vice-chair of Hokkaido Prefectural Assembly, age 60.

Results

References

Hokkaido gubernational elections
2011 elections in Japan